Butler is a town in and the county seat of Choctaw County, Alabama, United States. The population was 1,894 at the 2010 census.

History
When Choctaw County was formed in 1847, Butler was created as the county seat. The town was located and settled in 1848. It is named in honor of Colonel Pierce Butler, a soldier killed in the Mexican–American War.

Geography
Butler is located in north-central Choctaw County at  (32.091526, −88.220684).

Climate
According to the Köppen climate classification, Butler has a humid subtropical climate (abbreviated Cfa).

Demographics

2020 census

As of the 2020 United States Census, there were 1,871 people, 928 households, and 659 families residing in the town.

2010 census
As of the census of 2010, there were 1,894 people, 826 households, and 488 families residing in the city. The racial makeup of the city was 71.4% White, 26.7% Black or African American, 0.2% Native American, and 0.7% from two or more races. 0.7% of the population were Hispanic or Latino of any race.

There were 826 households, out of which 25.7% had children under the age of 18 living with them, 39.5% were married couples living together, 17.3% had a female householder with no husband present, and 40.9% were non-families. 37.8% of all households were made up of individuals, and 16.5% had someone living alone who was 65 years of age or older. The average household size was 2.14 and the average family size was 2.84.

In the city the population was spread out, with 22.0% under the age of 18, 7.7% from 18 to 24, 22.6% from 25 to 44, 23.6% from 45 to 64, and 24.1% who were 65 years of age or older. The median age was 42.5 years. For every 100 females, there were 86.4 males. For every 100 females age 18 and over, there were 87.3 males.

The median income for a household in the city was $43,173, and the median income for a family was $67,031. Males had a median income of $49,194 versus $17,500 for females. The per capita income for the city was $21,284. About 7.8% of families and 10.4% of the population were below the poverty line, including 14.6% of those under age 18 and 10.5% of those age 65 or over.

Education
Public education is provided by the Choctaw County School District.
 Choctaw County High School (grades 7 through 12)
 Choctaw County Elementary School (grades K through 6)

Patrician Academy is a private school (grades preK through 12) located in Butler.

Media
The Choctaw Sun-Advocate is the county's only print newspaper. The Choctaw Sun was established in 2003, later merging with the historic Choctaw Advocate, established in 1890, to form the Choctaw Sun-Advocate in 2006.

Radio
 WKLV-FM 93.5 FM K-Love (Contemporary Christian)
WDLG 90.1 FM (Catholic)

Notable people 
 Leon Bibb, first African American primetime news anchor in Ohio and former member of the Bowling Green State University Board of Trustees
 Eric Dubose, Major League Baseball pitcher
 Ty Herndon, country music singer
 Thomas Hopkins, NFL player
 Ced Landrum, Major League Baseball outfielder
 Phillip Lolley, former assistant coach and current administrator for the football team at Auburn University
 Kendrick Office, NFL player
 Johnny Ruffin, Major League Baseball pitcher
 Donald C. Simmons, Jr., educator, writer, poet and documentary film producer
 Brian Witherspoon, National Football League cornerback

Transportation
Intercity bus service is provided by Greyhound Lines.

References

External links

 Coastal Gateway Regional Economic Development Alliance
 Butler, AL profile at Choctaw County Public Library
 Choctaw County School District

Towns in Alabama
Towns in Choctaw County, Alabama
County seats in Alabama
Populated places established in 1848
1848 establishments in Alabama